Nuristan, also spelled as Nurestan or Nooristan, is one of the 34 provinces of Afghanistan, located in the eastern part of the country. It is divided into seven districts and is Afghanistan's least populous province, with a population of around 167,000. Parun serves as the provincial capital. Nuristan is bordered on the south by Laghman and Kunar provinces, on the north by Badakhshan province, on the west by Panjshir province.

The origins of the Nuristani people traces back to the 4th century BC. Some Nuristanis claim being descendants of the Greek occupying forces of Alexander the Great. It was formerly called Kafiristan ("Land of the Infidels") until the inhabitants were forcibly converted from an animist religion; a form of ancient Hinduism infused with local variations, to Islam in 1895, and thence the region has become known as Nuristan ("land of illumination", or "land of light"). The region was located in an area surrounded by Buddhist civilizations which were later taken over by Muslims. The origin of the local Nuristani people has been disputed, ranging from being the indigenous inhabitants forced to flee to this region after refusing to surrender to invaders, to being linked to various ancient groups of people and the Turk Shahi kings.

The primary occupations are agriculture, animal husbandry, and day labor. Located on the southern slopes of the Hindu Kush mountains in the northeastern part of the country, Nuristan spans the basins of the Alingar, Pech, Landai Sin, and Kunar rivers. Most of Nuristan is covered by mountainous forests and it has a rich biodiversity with a domestically unique monsoon climate by air coming from the Indian Ocean. As of 2020, the entirety of Nuristan is now a protected national park.

History

Early history
The surrounding area fell to Alexander the Great in 330 BC. It later fell to Chandragupta Maurya. The Mauryas introduced Buddhism to the region, and were attempting to expand their empire to Central Asia until they faced local Greco-Bactrian forces. Seleucus is said to have reached a peace treaty with Chandragupta by giving control of the territory south of the Hindu Kush to the Mauryas upon intermarriage and 500 elephants.

Before their conversion to Islam, the Nuristanis practiced a form of ancient Hinduism infused with locally developed accretions. They were called "kafirs" due to their enduring paganism while other regions around them became Muslim. However, the influence from district names in Kafiristan of Katwar or Kator and the ethnic name Kati has also been suggested.

The area extending from modern Nuristan to Kashmir was known as "Puritan", a vast area containing a host of "Kafir" cultures and Indo-European languages that became Islamized over a long period. Earlier, it was surrounded by Buddhist areas. The Islamization of the nearby Badakhshan began in the 8th century and Peristan was surrounded by Muslim states in the 16th century with the Islamization of Baltistan. The Buddhist states temporarily brought literacy and state rule into the region. The decline of Buddhism resulted in it becoming heavily isolated.

There have been varying theories about the origins of Kafirs including the Arab tribe of Quraish, or Gabars of Persia, the Greek soldiers of Alexander as well as the Indians of eastern Afghanistan. George Scott Robertson considered them to be part of the old Indian population of Eastern Afghanistan and stated they fled to the mountains after the Muslim invasion in the 10th century. He added they probably found other races there whom they killed off and enslaved or amalgamated with them.

Oral traditions of some of the Nuristanis place themselves to be at the confluence of Kabul River and Kunar River a millennium ago. These traditions state they were driven off from Kandahar to Kabul to Kapisa to Kama with the Muslim invasion. They identify themselves as late arrivals in Nuristan, being driven by Mahmud of Ghazni who after establishing his empire forced the unsubmissive population to flee.

The name Kator was used by Lagaturman, last king of the Turk Shahi. Apparently due to its usage by the last Turk-Shahi ruler, it was adopted as a title by the ruler of the north-west region of the Indian subcontinent, comprising Chitral and Kafiristan. The title "Shah Kator" was assumed by Chitral's ruler Mohtaram Shah who assumed it upon being impressed by the majesty of the erstwhile pagan rulers of Chitral. The theory of Kators being related to Turki Shahis is based on the information of Jami- ut-Tawarikh and Tarikh-i-Binakiti. The region was also named after its ruling elite. The royal usage may be the origin behind the name of Kator.

The high god of the pre-Islamic Nuristani religion was the god Imra, derived from the Hindu god Yama, and was also called Mara. Another god was Indr, derived from Indra. He was seen as the brother of the god Gisht and father of Pano and the goddess Dishani. There were also many other minor gods worshiped in the region.

The region was invaded by forces of Afghan Amir Abdur Rahman Khan in 1896 and most of the people were converted either by choice or did so to avoid the jizya:

The region was renamed Nuristan, meaning Land of the enlightened, a reflection of the "enlightening" of the pagan Nuristani by the "light-giving" of Islam.

Nuristan was once thought to have been a region through which Alexander the Great passed with a detachment of his army; thus the folk legend that the Nuristani people are descendants of Alexander (or "his generals").

In the 19th century, the Emirate of Afghanistan incorporated Nuristan into its territory via military conquest; this occurred around the same time as the beginning of European influence in Afghanistan. During this period, one of the most well known Afghan generals from this period, Abdul Wakil Khan, was born in Nuristan. He fought against the insurgent forces of Habibullāh Kalakāni and was buried on the same plateau where Afghan king Amanullah Khan is buried.

Recent history

Since the creation of Pakistan in 1947, Afghan politicians (particularly Mohammed Daoud Khan) have been focused on re-annexing Khyber Pakhtunkhwa and the Federally Administered Tribal Areas of what is now Pakistan. This has led to militancy on both sides of the Durand Line.

Nuristan was the scene of some of the heaviest guerrilla fighting during the 1980s Soviet–Afghan War. The province was influenced by Mawlawi Afzal's Islamic Revolutionary State of Afghanistan, which was supported by Pakistan nationalists and Saudi Arabia. It dissolved under the Islamic Emirate of Afghanistan (Taliban rule) in the late 1990s.

Nuristan is one of the poorest and most remote provinces of Afghanistan. Few NGO's operate in Nuristan because of the Taliban insurgency and the lack of safe roads. Some road construction projects were launched linking Nangarej to Mandol and Chapa Dara to Titan Dara. The Afghan government also worked on a direct road route to Laghman province, in order to reduce dependence on the road through restive Kunar province to the rest of Afghanistan. Other road projects were started aimed at improving the primitive road from Kamdesh to Barg-i Matal, and from Nangalam in Kunar province to the provincial center at Parun.

Since Nuristan is a highly ethnically homogeneous province, there are few incidents of inter-ethnic violence. However, there are instances of disputes among inhabitants, some of which continue for decades. Nuristan has suffered from its inaccessibility and lack of infrastructure. The government presence is under-developed, even compared to neighboring provinces. Nuristan's formal educational sector is weak, with few professional teachers. Due to its proximity to Pakistan, many of the inhabitants are actively involved in trade and commerce across the border.

A map from the Afghan Ministry of the Interior produced in 2009 showed the western region of Nuristan to be under "enemy control". There have been numerous conflicts between militants and U.S.-led Afghan security forces. In April 2008 members of the 3rd Special Forces Group led Afghan soldiers from the Commando Brigade into the Shok valley in an unsuccessful attempt to capture warlord Gulbuddin Hekmatyar. In July 2008 approximately 200 Taliban guerrillas attacked a NATO position just south of Nuristan, near the village of Wanat in the Waygal District, killing 9 U.S. soldiers. In the following year, in early October, more than 350 insurgents backed by members of the Hezb-e Islami Gulbuddin and other militia groups fought U.S.-led Afghan security forces in the Battle of Kamdesh at Camp Keating in Nuristan. The base was nearly overrun; more than 100 Taliban fighters, eight U.S. soldiers, and seven members of the Afghan security forces were killed during the fighting. Four days after the battle, in early October 2009, U.S. forces withdrew from their four main bases in Nuristan, as part of a plan by General Stanley McChrystal to pull troops out of small outposts and relocate them closer to major towns. The U.S. has pulled out from some areas in the past, but never from all four main bases. A month after the U.S. pullout the Taliban was governing openly in Nuristan. According to The Economist, Nuristan is "a place so tough that NATO abandoned it in 2010 after failing to subdue it."

In 2021, the Taliban gained control of the province during the 2021 Taliban offensive.

Healthcare

The percentage of households with clean drinking water increased from 2% in 2005 to 12% in 2011.
The percentage of births attended by a skilled birth attendant increased from 1% in 2005 to 22% in 2011.

Education

In 2002 the first gender assessment of women's conditions in Nuristan was completed. The overall literacy rate (6+ years of age) fell from 17.7% in 2005 to 17% in 2011. 
The overall net enrolment rate (6–13 years of age) increased from 8.7% in 2005 to 45% in 2011.

Demographics

As of 2021, the total population of the province is about 166,676. According to the Naval Postgraduate School, 87% are Nuristanis, 10% Pashtuns and less than 3% Gujars and ethnic Tajiks.

Approximately 90% of the population speak the following five Nuristani languages, as well as one Indo-Aryan language:

Askunu language
Kamkata-viri language
Vasi-vari language
Tregami language
Kalasha-ala language
Pashayi languages are used by about 15% of the population.

The main Nuristani tribes in the province are:
 Kata or Katta (38%)
 Waigali or Kalasha (30%)
 Ashkun or Wamai (12%)
 Kam or Kom (10%)
 Satra (5%)
 Wasi or Parsoon (4%)

Dari/Pashto are used as second and third languages in the province.

Districts

In popular culture
Nuristan is the subject of the book A Short Walk in the Hindu Kush by the British travel writer Eric Newby.
Nuristan was the location of three of the missions in Hitman 2: Silent Assassin.
Rudyard Kipling's short story The Man Who Would Be King and the film inspired by it are set in "Kafiristan" (the earlier name of pre-Islamic Nuristan).
Nuristan is the setting of the book Red Platoon by Medal of Honor recipient Clinton Romesha.
Nuristan is where three young diplomats, American, English, and German visited in 1960 "...to penetrate a land that few westerners had set eyes on." Their book is A Passage to Nuristan: Exploring the Mysterious Afghan Hinterland by Joseph T. Kendrick (Author), Nicholas Barrington (Author), Reinhard Schlagintweit (Author), Sandy Gall (Foreword).

Notable people from the province
 Gen. Abdu Wakil Khan
 Gen. Ghorzi
 Ex. Mayor of Kabul Akbar
 Mohammad Qassim Jangulbagh
 Tamim Nuristani Nuristani
 Jamaluddin Bader
 Hafeez Nuristani Nuristani
 Ahmad Yusuf Nuristani
 Abdul Qadir Nuristani
 Mohammed Nadir Atash
 Col. Issa Khan Nuristani
 Khalilullah Nuristani
 General Sarwar Khan Nuristani
 Col. Noorullah Khan
 Col. Din Mohammad Khan
 Col. Haroon Khan
 Col. Jan Gul Khan
 Col. Jan Muhammad Khan
 Lt. Col. Nazar Muhammad Khan
Abdul Wahid Nuristani

See also
Geography of Afghanistan
Provinces of Afghanistan

Notes

References

Further reading
 Dupree, Nancy Hatch (1977): An Historical Guide to Afghanistan. 1st Edition: 1970. 2nd Edition. Revised and Enlarged. Afghan Tourist Organization. LINK
 Richard F. Strand. (1997–present) Richard Strand's Nuristan Site LINK. The most accurate and comprehensive source on Nuristan, by the world's leading scholar on the languages and ethnic groups of Nuristan.
 M. Klimburg. NURISTAN in Encyclopædia Iranica.  LINK
 Jettmar, Karl (1986) The Religions of the Hindukush: Vol 1: The Religions of the Kafirs: The Pre-islamic Heritage of Afghan Nuristan. 
 Edelberg, Lennart (1984) "Nuristani Buildings" Jutland Archaeological Society Publications, Vol. 18, 1984.
 Edelberg, Lennart & Schuyler Jones (1979) "Nuristan" Akademische Druck- und Verlagsanstalt, Graz, Austria
 Jones, Schuyler (1992) "Afghanistan" Vol. 135 of the World Bibliographical Series, Clio Press, Oxford.
 Jones, Schuyler (1974) "Men of Influence in Nuristan: A Study of Social Control & Dispute Settlement in Waigal Valley, Afghanistan." Seminar Press, London & New York.
 Wilber, Donald N. (1968)Annotated Bibliography of Afghanistan. Human Relations Area Files, New Haven, Conn. 
 Jones, Schuyler (1966) An Annotated Bibliography of Nuristan (Kafiristan) and the Kalash Kafirs of Chitral, Part One. Royal Danish Academy of Sciences & Letters, Vol. 41, No. 3.
 Kukhtina, Tatiyana I. (1965) Bibliografiya Afghanistana: Literatuyra na russkom yazyka. Nauka, Moscow.
 Akram, Mohammed (1947) Bibliographie de l'Afghanistan, I, ouvrages parus hors de l'Afghanistan. Centre de Documentation Universitaire, Paris.
 Robertson, Sir George S. (1900) The Kafirs of Hindu-Kush. 
 کشمکش های تاریخی و سرنوشت قبیله الکته (۱۴۰۰)

External sources

 Nuristan Province by the Naval Postgraduate School (NPS)
 Nuristan Province by the Institute for the Study of War (ISW)

 
Provinces of Afghanistan
History of Nuristan Province
Hindu Kush
States and territories established in 2001
2001 establishments in Afghanistan
Provinces of the Islamic Republic of Afghanistan